Seminary of the Southwest (formally the Episcopal Theological Seminary of the Southwest and informally SSW) is an Episcopal seminary in Austin, Texas. It is one of nine accredited seminaries of the Episcopal Church in the United States. Seminary of the Southwest forms Christian leaders pursuing ordination within the  church, as well as those interested in lay forms of ministry, including chaplaincy and counseling.

History
The Episcopal Theological Seminary of the Southwest was founded in 1952 during a period of tremendous growth in the church. Bishop John E. Hines, coadjutor of the Episcopal Diocese of Texas, began this institution as "seminary for the whole church" to accommodate the overflow of enrollment in the other established Episcopal seminaries. The seminary received a charter from the state of Texas in 1951 and was recognized as an agency of the Diocese of Texas in January 1952. It originated in the central and low church traditions of the church.

Three clergymen served as the initial instructors: Gray M. Blandy, instructor at the Canterbury Bible Chair and chaplain of Episcopal students at the University of Texas at Austin; Lawrence Brown, Bible Chair instructor at the Agricultural and Mechanical College of Texas (now Texas A&M University) at College Station; and John M. Holt, vicar of the mission church at Mexia. Blandy was also the seminary’s first dean.

In 1954, a five-acre land donation enabled the construction of its campus, which was completed in the early 1970s with the gift of the historic Rather House.

Following a period of instability within the Episcopal Church during the 1960s, Seminary of the Southwest faced lower enrollment in the 1970s.  One response was the introduction of cross-cultural theological education through the new Center for Hispanic Ministries to strengthen the Church’s Hispanic population in the region.

In 1976, the Episcopal Church officially approved the ordination of women as priests to take effective 1 January 1977; Susan Buell became Seminary of the Southwest's first female graduate to be ordained in 1978.  The next year saw nine women enrolling for ordination studies, accounting for about a third of the total entering class.

The mid-1980s brought a revised curriculum and the introduction of lay theological education for non-ordained individuals. In 1988, Seminary of the Southwest tried a new approach to fundraising by requesting financial support from alumni; today the school has one of the highest percentages of alumni support of all US seminaries.

In 1994, several new campus facilities were dedicated: auditorium, bookstore, community center, dining hall, guest housing; in 2003, a building with new faculty offices and classrooms was completed.

The seminary changed its name from the Episcopal Theological Seminary of the Southwest adopted the name Seminary of the Southwest in an effort to re-brand and better market itself in the face of dwindling enrollment.  The new name, Seminary of the Southwest, was launched as part of a new brand identity campaign along with a new website. The Episcopal Theological Seminary of the Southwest remains the business name.

About
Seminary of the Southwest is accredited by the Southern Association of Colleges and Schools Commission on Colleges (SACSCOC) to award master’s degrees and post-baccalaureate diplomas. The seminary is also accredited by the Commission on Accrediting of Association of Theological Schools in the United States and Canada. The seminary belongs to the Council of Southwestern Theological Schools and the American Theological Library Association.

Seminary of the Southwest is one of eight official US Episcopal Church seminaries.

Between 2001 and 2011, Seminary of the Southwest trained eight percent of Episcopal priests.

Programs

Degree programs 
 Master of Divinity
 Master of Divinity with Hispanic church studies concentration
 Master of Arts in religion
 Master of Arts in chaplaincy and pastoral care
 Master of Arts in counseling
 Master of Arts in spiritual formation

Diploma programs 
 Diploma in Anglican studies

Continuing education 

 Contact hours for continuing education units (CEU)
 Online School for Spirituality and Mission (non-credit)
 Continuing education courses/workshops

Campus information

Christ Chapel 
The chapel, including the floor-to-ceiling hand-blown stained glass windows, was designed by architect Arthur Fehr.

Booher Library 

On site, holdings of the Booher Library include more than 150,000 items, with several thousand in Spanish.  The collection provides nearly 500 print periodical titles as well.  Ample resources relate to the major theological disciplines, including an abundance of materials concerned with the tradition and history of the Episcopal Church.  The Booher Library collaborates closely with the Stitt Library at Austin Presbyterian Theological Seminary, just a few blocks away.  A slightly longer walk takes seminarians to the fifth largest library consortium in the United States, the General Libraries of the University of Texas at Austin, including their unequaled Benson Latin American Collection.  All these libraries extend borrowing privileges to our students free of charge.  The internet and the OCLC international network of libraries provide materials unavailable locally; and the library offers a growing number of electronic resources including ATLAS Full Text Plus, TexShare, and EBSCO.

Archives of the Episcopal Church 
Located on the top floor of the Booher library, the Archives of the Episcopal Church (USA) is the national research repository for the Episcopal Church and houses the records of the General Convention, the Domestic and Foreign Missionary Society, the Presiding Bishops, Commissions and Committees, Episcopal Church organizations and personal papers.  The archives serves the broader mission of the church by using its resources to support individual ministry, education, community identity and the corporate life of the institutional church.  The archives serves as an information resource for inquirers throughout the church and seminarians are welcome to visit the archives with questions.

Diocese of Texas regional office 
The office of the West Region of the Episcopal Diocese of Texas is located on the campus of the Seminary of the Southwest.

Loise Henderson Wessendorff Center for Christian Ministry and Vocation 

The Loise Henderson Wessendorff Center for Christian Ministry and Vocation at Seminary of the Southwest is founded on the principal that God calls all Christians to the service of the Gospel.  The mission of the center is to support Christians in discerning what it means to respond faithfully to God’s call in their particular lives and circumstances.  Through its programs and degrees, the Center provides educational opportunities for men and women from any denomination (or from a non-denominational community) to strengthen their knowledge of theology, scripture, and ethics, as well as pursue more specific training in chaplaincy, counseling, spiritual formation, youth ministry and Christian education.

A $2.5 million endowment in March 2013 enabled Seminary of the Southwest to expand the CCMV. The new center was dedicated in Fall 2013 under its new name, the Loise Henderson Wessendorff Center for Christian Ministry and Vocation.

Cross-cultural programs 
Students are encouraged to undertake placements abroad.  SSW has developed a relationship with the Diocese of Peshawar in Pakistan.  Students have also undertaken study in Kenya, Belize, Panama, and the Dominican Republic.

Financial aid 
Seminary of the Southwest provides scholarship grants to students with demonstrated financial need. Endowments and gifts from supporters provide the resources for this support. As a matter of institutional policy, the seminary seeks to practice good stewardship in the administration of scholarship programs. In so doing, the seminary strongly discourages students from incurring debt in order to attend, and the seminary awards as much as possible, preferring to err on the side of generosity.

Seminary of the Southwest students enrolled in a Master of Divinity degree program are also eligible to apply for a traditional scholarship through the Society for the Increase of the Ministry (SIM).

Leadership
The seminary appointed new leadership effective June 2013. Cynthia Briggs Kittredge was appointed as the eighth dean and president of the seminary. She has taught courses on the New Testament since joining the faculty in 1999, and has been the academic dean since 2010.

Academic dean Scott Bader-Saye has been a professor with the seminary since 2009.  He holds the Helen and Everett H. Jones Chair of Christian Ethics and Moral Theology.  He will continue to teach core ethics courses during his tenure as academic dean.

References

Footnotes

Bibliography

Further reading

External links 
 

Anglican seminaries and theological colleges
Seminaries and theological colleges in Texas
Episcopal Church (United States)
Episcopal Church in Texas
Universities and colleges accredited by the Southern Association of Colleges and Schools
Universities and colleges in Austin, Texas
Educational institutions established in 1951
1951 establishments in Texas